11 Minutes may refer to:

 Eleven Minutes, a 2003 novel by Paulo Coelho
 11 Minutes (film), a 2015 film written and directed by Jerzy Skolimowski
 "11 Minutes" (song), a 2019 song by Yungblud and Halsey